Olga Homeghi (later Bularda and then Ionita, born 1 May 1958) is a retired Romanian rower. She competed at the 1980, 1984 and 1988 Olympics and won two gold, one silver and one bronze medal, all in different events. At the world championships she won three gold, two silver and two bronze medals between 1979 and 1987.

References

External links 

 
 
 
 

Romanian female rowers
Olympic rowers of Romania
Rowers at the 1980 Summer Olympics
Rowers at the 1984 Summer Olympics
Rowers at the 1988 Summer Olympics
Olympic gold medalists for Romania
Olympic bronze medalists for Romania
Living people
1958 births
Olympic medalists in rowing
World Rowing Championships medalists for Romania
Medalists at the 1988 Summer Olympics
Medalists at the 1984 Summer Olympics
Medalists at the 1980 Summer Olympics
Olympic silver medalists for Romania
20th-century Romanian women
People from Fieni